The Cyclopedia Talislanta Volume II: The Seven Kingdoms is a supplement published by Bard Games in 1989 for the fantasy role-playing game Talislanta.

Contents
The Cyclopedia Talislanta Volume II: The Seven Kingdoms is a campaign setting that describe the seven kingdoms, and includes new regional types and two adventure scenarios.

Publication history
Bard Games published the role-playing game Talislanta in 1987. Over the next three years, the company published six volumes of supplemental information about the setting in their Cyclopedia Talislanta series. The second in the series, The Cyclopedia Talislanta Volume II: The Seven Kingdoms, was written by Thomas M. Kane, Anthony Pryor, Curtis M. Scott, and Craig Sheeley, and edited by W.G. Armintrout and Stephan Michael Sechi. Artwork was by Ron Spencer, Patty Sechi, Richard Thomas, and Stephan Michael Sechi. It was published by Bard Games in 1989 as a 72-page softcover book.

Reviews
White Wolf #19 (Feb./March, 1990)
Alarums & Excursions #187 ("Mermecolion at a Picnic", March 1991)

References

Role-playing game supplements introduced in 1989
Talislanta supplements